Gabriela Capová (born 1993) is a Czech alpine ski racer.

She competed at the 2015 World Championships in Beaver Creek, USA, in the slalom.

References

1993 births
Czech female alpine skiers
Living people
Alpine skiers at the 2018 Winter Olympics
Alpine skiers at the 2022 Winter Olympics
Olympic alpine skiers of the Czech Republic
Sportspeople from Ostrava